Patrick Dehornoy  (11 September 1952 – 4 September 2019) was a mathematician at the University of Caen Normandy who worked on set theory and group theory.

Early life and education 
Dehornoy was born on 11 September 1952 in Rouen, France. He graduated from the Lycée Pierre-Corneille in 1971. He studied at the École normale supérieure from 1971 to 1975 and completed his Ph.D. in 1978 at the University of Paris, with a thesis written under the direction of Kenneth Walter McAloon.

Career
Dehornoy was a researcher at the French National Centre for Scientific Research (CNRS) from 1975 to 1982. He was at the University of Caen Normandy as a Professor from 1983 to 2017 and as an Emeritus Professor from 2017 until his death. Dehornoy died on 4 September 2019 in Villejuif, France at the age of 66.

Research
Dehornoy found one of the first applications of large cardinals to algebra by constructing a certain left-invariant total order, called the Dehornoy order, on the braid group. In his later career, he was a major contributor to the theory of braid groups, including creating a fast algorithm for comparing braids, and was one of the main contributors to the development of Garside methods.

Awards
In 1999, Dehornoy received the Ferran Sunyer i Balaguer Prize. In 2002, he was elected a senior member of the Institut Universitaire de France (renewed in 2007). In 2014, he received the EMS Monograph Award for his book Foundations of Garside Theory.

Selected publications

References

External links

1952 births
2019 deaths
20th-century French mathematicians
21st-century French mathematicians
École Normale Supérieure alumni
Academic staff of the University of Caen Normandy
Scientists from Rouen
Group theorists
Set theorists
Research directors of the French National Centre for Scientific Research